Cascades is a census-designated place (CDP) in Loudoun County, Virginia, United States. The population as of the 2010 United States Census was 11,912. Along with nearby Countryside and Lowes Island, it is considered one of the three main components of the Potomac Falls community (ZIP code 20165) within Sterling, Virginia.

The corresponding homeowners association was incorporated on November 8, 1990. As in nearby Sterling Park, prior to the establishment of the Cascades community in 1990 the area was made up of a few very large farms. The homeowners association maintains five community centers, five swimming pools, 15 tennis courts, and other amenities including extensive paved walking trails. The Lowes Island at Cascades community (commonly referred to as Lowes Island) is an advertised portion of the legal subdivision of Cascades, but is not a legal subdivision itself. The Lowes Island community is centered on Trump National Golf Club Washington, D.C., formerly Lowes Island Country Club. The Cascades development is bordered on the north by the Potomack Lake Sportsplex and Algonkian Regional Park (which abuts the Potomac River); both facilities are included in the Cascades census-designated place. The name "Cascades" alludes to the rapidly descending flow along the Potomac River starting at Lowes Island and leading to Great Falls.

The commercial core of Cascades is Cascades Marketplace, a  retail center adjacent to the Cascades Public Library and very near the Loudoun campus of Northern Virginia Community College. Great Falls Plaza is a second, smaller retail center located just outside Lowes Island. Area public schools include Potomac Falls High School, River Bend Middle School, Potowmack Elementary School, Horizon Elementary School, and Lowes Island Elementary School. The Cascades area encompasses the gated campus of the Falcons Landing retirement community for retired U.S. military officers. Cascades is served by Loudoun County Sheriff's Office, the Sterling Volunteer Fire Department, and the Potomac Falls post office.

Neighboring communities 

The Potomack Lakes Sportsplex and Algonkian Regional Park are north of the Cascades development but are included in the Cascades census-designated place. The northern boundary of the CDP is the Potomac River. Neighboring communities to the CDP are:
 To the east, Sugarland Run and Lowes Island
 To the west, Countryside
 To the south, across Route 7, Dulles Town Center and the remainder of Sterling (outside Cascades) including Sterling Park.

References

External links
Cascades Community Association

Census-designated places in Loudoun County, Virginia
Washington metropolitan area
Census-designated places in Virginia